Margaret Martonosi is an American computer scientist who is currently the Hugh Trumbull Adams '35 Professor of Computer Science at Princeton University. Martonosi is noted for her research in computer architecture and mobile computing with a particular focus on power-efficiency.

She is also noted for her leadership in 
broadening participation in computing. She is currently co-chair of the CRA-W Board. In 2016, she was appointed to a six-year term as an Andrew Dickson White professor-at-large at Cornell University.

On September 23, 2019, the National Science Foundation announced that Martonosi had been selected to serve as head of the Directorate for Computer and Information Science and Engineering (CISE) at NSF. She started on February 1, 2020.

Biography
Margaret Rose Martonosi was born in Boston, Massachusetts. She received a B.S. in Electrical Engineering from Cornell University in 1986. She received a M.S. in Electrical Engineering from Stanford University in 1987 and a Ph.D in Electrical Engineering from Stanford University in 1993.

After a brief post-doc at Stanford, she joined the Department of Electrical Engineering at Princeton University in 1994 as an assistant professor. She was promoted to Associate Professor in 2000 and to Professor in 2004. In 2010 she moved to the Computer Science Department at Princeton University.

Career
In the area of power-aware computer architecture, Martonosi is known for her work on the Wattch power modeling infrastructure. Among the first architecture-level power modeling tools, Wattch demonstrated that early-stage power modeling tools could be accurate enough to allow computer architects to assess processor power consumption early enough in the design process for power to have a substantive influence on design choices. Martonosi's group has also performed research on real-system power measurement, and on power and thermal management.

In the area of mobile systems, some of Martonosi's early work included the design and deployment of mobile sensors for tracking zebras in Kenya  This work demonstrated the use of delay tolerant protocols  and low-power GPS devices  for wildlife tracking. More recently, Martonosi has researched human mobility patterns  and has developed novel mobile applications for crowdsourcing traffic information.

Awards

In 2009 she was named an ACM Fellow "for contributions in power-aware computing."

In 2010, she was named an IEEE Fellow "for contributions to power-efficient computer architecture and systems design."

In 2015, she was named a Jefferson Science Fellow and served in the Bureau of Economic and Business Affairs at the United States Department of State. She won the 2015 ISCA Influential Paper Award for her co-authored paper describing a framework for architectural-level power analysis and optimizations.

In 2017 she received the SIGMOBILE Test-of-Time Award for the ASPLOs 2002 paper entitled "Energy-Efficient Computing for Wildlife Tracking: Design Tradeoffs and Early Experiences with ZebraNet," with co-authors Philo Juang, Hidekazu Oki, Yong Wang, Li-Shiuan Peh, and Daniel Rubenstein.

In 2020 she became a member of the American Academy of Arts and Sciences.

In 2021, Martonosi was elected as a member of the National Academy of Engineering "for contributions to power-aware and power-efficient computer architectures and mobile systems".

In June 2021, Martonosi won the ACM-IEEE CS Eckert-Mauchly Award "for contributions in power-aware computing."

Her other notable awards include:

 Semiconductor Research Corporation (SRC) Aristotle Award for graduate research advising 2019
 ACM SIGARCH Alan D. Berenbaum Distinguished Service Award 2019
 IEEE International Conference on High-Performance Computer Architecture Test of Time Paper Award 2018 
 IEEE Computer Society Technical Achievement Award 2018 
 ACM Sensys Test of Time Award 2017 
 Marie R. Pistilli Women in EDA Achievement Award 2015 
 Grace Hopper Celebration of Women in Computing Technical Leadership ABIE Award Winner 2013
 NCWIT Undergraduate Mentor Award in May 2013
 Best Paper award at the Ninth International Conference on Mobile Systems, Applications and Services (MobiSys), in Washington, D. C. in June 2011. The paper was SignalGuru: Leveraging Mobile Phones for Collaborative Traffic Signal Schedule Advisory. Her co-authors were Emmanouil Koukoumidis and Li-Shiuan Peh.
 Best paper award at MICRO-38 for the paper titled A Dynamic Compilation Framework for Controlling Microprocessor Energy and Performance in 2005

References

External links
 Princeton University: Margaret Martonosi, Department of Computer Science
 
 Cornell University Andrew Dickson White Professors-at-Large Biography

American women computer scientists
American computer scientists
Princeton University faculty
Fellows of the Association for Computing Machinery
Fellow Members of the IEEE
Fellows of the American Academy of Arts and Sciences
Members of the United States National Academy of Engineering
Living people
Cornell University alumni
People from Boston
Jefferson Science Fellows
Year of birth missing (living people)
Electronic engineering award winners
American women academics
21st-century American women